Christian Dalger (born 19 December 1949 in Nîmes, Gard) is a French former professional footballer who played as a forward. He made six international caps for France, scoring two goals.

During his career he played for clubs including SC Toulon (1962–1971) and AS Monaco (1971–1980), with whom he won the French title in 1978. He was a member of the France national team in the 1978 FIFA World Cup. After his professional career he became a football manager.

References

External links
 
 
 Profile 

1949 births
Footballers from Nîmes
Living people
French footballers
Association football forwards
France international footballers
SC Toulon players
AS Monaco FC players
Ligue 1 players
Ligue 2 players
1978 FIFA World Cup players
French football managers
SC Toulon managers
Grenoble Foot 38 managers
FC Martigues managers
French expatriate football managers
French expatriate sportspeople in Algeria
Expatriate football managers in Algeria
French expatriate sportspeople in Mali
Expatriate football managers in Mali
Mali national football team managers